Union Raiffeisen Radteam Tirol is an Austrian road cycling team founded in 2001. Prior to 2021, the team held club status, before upgrading to UCI Continental.

Team roster

References

External links

UCI Continental Teams (Europe)
Cycling teams based in Austria
Cycling teams established in 2001
2001 establishments in Austria